Halone pteridaula, the brown halone, is a species of moth of the subfamily Arctiinae first described by Turner in 1922. It is known from the Australian Capital Territory, New South Wales, Queensland, Tasmania and Victoria, all in Australia.

Adults have dark brown forewings, each with two ragged white bands.

References

Lithosiini